Bornemann is a German surname. Notable people with the surname include:

Christian Bornemann (born 1965), German Windsurfer
Elsa Bornemann (1952–2013), recognized Argentine doctor of the Arts, polyglot and composer
Ernest Bornemann (1915–1995), German writer, anthropologist, psychoanalyst and sexologist
Frank Bornemann (born 1949), the guitarist for German progressive rock band Eloy
Fritz Bornemann (1912–2007), German architect
Hans Bornemann (1448–1474), late Gothic painter who was active in Hamburg
Hinrik Bornemann (born 1450), Northern German Late Gothic painter
Ole Bornemann Bull (physician) (1842–1916), Norwegian ophthalmologist
Rebeccah Bornemann (born 1971 or 1972), Canadian para-swimmer

German-language surnames